Priestley is an impact crater in the Eridania quadrangle of Mars, located at 54.4°S latitude and 229.4°W longitude. It measures  in diameter and was named after English clergyman and scientist Joseph Priestley. The naming was approved by the International Astronomical Union's Working Group for Planetary System Nomenclature in 1973.

The larger crater Haldane is to the northwest of Priestley.

See also 
 Climate of Mars
 Geology of Mars
 Impact crater
 Impact event
 List of craters on Mars
 Ore resources on Mars
 Planetary nomenclature

References 

Eridania quadrangle
Impact craters on Mars